Typhoon Melor, known in the Philippines as Typhoon Quedan, was the second category 5 super typhoon in 2009. It interacted with Typhoon Parma in the first week of October southeast of Taiwan.

Meteorological history

On September 28, an area of convectional cloudiness formed 370 km (230 mi) to the northeast of Pohnpei. Satellite imagery showed a Low Level Circulation Centre had begun to form. On the evening of September 28, due to a TUTT that was providing good outflow for the system and low level vertical wind shear with a favorable environment, the JTWC issued a Tropical Cyclone Formation Alert. Early on September 29, both JMA and JTWC upgraded the system into a tropical depression. Early on September 30, JMA reported that the depression had intensified into a tropical storm and assigned its international designated name, Melor. At the same time JTWC also classified the depression as a tropical storm. Early on October 1, Melor intensified further from a severe tropical storm into a typhoon. Intensification continued, and by the afternoon of the same day the JTWC reported that Melor had intensified into a Category 1-equivalent typhoon. In just four hours, it intensified rapidly to a Category 3-equivalent typhoon, and continued to track towards northeast Luzon. Early on October 2, it strengthened to a Category 4-equivalent typhoon. After levelling out in intensity, it strengthened again on October 3. Early October 4, JTWC reported that Melor had intensified to a Category-5 equivalent super typhoon, with JMA reporting a central pressure of 910 hPa and winds of 205 km/h. On October 5, PAGASA allocated the name Quedan to the typhoon as the storm moved into Philippine's area of responsibility. It interacted with Typhoon Parma in Parma's second landfall in the Philippines. By the midday of October 8, Melor made landfall on Japan. After landfall, JMA downgraded Melor into a severe tropical storm, while the JTWC downgraded it into an extratropical storm. Late on October 11, the extratropical remnants of Melor were completely absorbed by a newly formed extratropical storm to the north, near Alaska. The new extratropical storm then strengthened into a powerful storm, which then began to impact the west coast of the United States, late on October 13.

Preparations
Late on September 30, the island of Guam, was placed under a tropical storm warning, while the islands of Rota, Tinian and Saipan were placed under a typhoon watch. These warnings stayed in force until late on October 1, when the islands of Tinian and Saipan were placed under a typhoon warning. The warnings for the islands of Rota, Agrihan and Guam were also revised at this time with Rota and Agrihan placed under typhoon watches and tropical storm warnings, while Guam was placed under a tropical storm warning. Late the next day the warnings were once again revised with the tropical storm warning for Guam and while the typhoon watch was cancelled for both Rota and Agrihan, with Agrihan placed under a typhoon warning. Rotas remaining tropical storm warning was then cancelled early on October 3, before all of the warnings were cancelled later that day as Melor moved away from the Mariana Islands.

Japan
The Japan Meteorological Agency forecast that Typhoon Melor would make landfall near Tokyo on October 8 (Thursday). Weather forecasters issued warnings about strong winds and high waves on the sea. Melor moved with wind speeds of 252 kilometers per hour (156 mph) and bore down on the island of Minami Daito. Typhoon Melor, which was located at 512 km from the southeast of Naha in Okinawa on October 6 at 12 p.m. Japan time, was predicted to be on a path for Tokyo. The Japan Meteorological Agency forecast that the typhoon would have a speed of 180 km/h near its center. An official at the agency warned residents that the typhoon could bring very strong winds and high sea waves.

Impact

Mariana Islands

Although a very powerful typhoon during its passage of the Mariana Islands, Melor produced little damage in the region. The main effects were minor flooded from heavy rainfall in Saipan. High winds also downed a few power lines and trees; however, no structural damage was reported. Roughly  of rain fell on the island during the passage of Melor, including  during a six-hour span. At the height of the storm, roughly 500 residences were without power on Tinian and Saipan; this was quickly reduced to 90 residences within several hours.

Japan

As a weakened typhoon, Melor made landfall in Japan on October 7 with wind gusts over 155 km/h (100 mph), causing massive power outages. At the height of the storm, an estimated 500,000 residences, mainly around Tokyo, were without power. Trains were canceled during the storm as they were unable to travel in conditions produced by the storm. More than 2 million people, attempting to get to work, were stranded as transportation halted. According to the Fire and Disaster Management Agency, two people were killed during the storm and at least 100 other were injured throughout the country in various incidents. The first death occurred after a man on a motorcycle crashed into a downed tree and the other occurred after a man was struck by a broken tree limb. Roughly 400 homes were damaged or destroyed by Melor and monetary damages amounted to 130 billion yen ($1.5 billion USD).

Another 64 people were injured, according to local media reports, after Melor reached landfall in Japan's Aichi prefecture early Thursday morning.

Typhoon Melor landed south-west of Tokyo on the main island of Honshū on Thursday, October 8, causing at least two deaths and cutting electricity to thousands. Flights were also canceled and people evacuated amid flood and landslide warnings.

Still, initial damage reports suggested the typhoon, while powerful, did not cause the type of widespread devastation initially warned. Meteorologists had been warning that the storm could be the most powerful to hit Japan in more than a decade. Melor was the first typhoon to reach landfall in Japan in two years.

The storm was expected to drift off the country's eastern coast into the Pacific Ocean by Thursday evening. An official at Japan's meteorological agency said the storm weakened as it moved along the eastern coast, preventing heavier damage.

The typhoon brought wind speeds of about 160 kilometers per hour while dumping 30 centimeters of rain in some regions, according to Japan Meteorological Agency.

One 54-year-old man was killed while delivering newspapers when his bike hit a fallen tree in the early morning, while a 69-year-old man died in Saitama prefecture near Tokyo after a tree fell on him, according to local police officials.

Many factories in the manufacturing-rich prefectures in central Japan were also shut from the storm.

California

On October 14, 2009, the extratropical cyclone that had absorbed Melor's remnants impacted California, and broke several rainfall records. Local California media had reported that the remnant of Typhoon Melor was able to kick up winds to as high as 70 mph (110 km/h). Some trees and power lines were downed as a result of this storm. Melor's remnants produced up to 10 inches of rain in California's Santa Cruz Mountains.

Aftermath

Japan
The typhoon left 3 dead and caused $1.5 billion (2009 USD) in damage.

See also

2009 Pacific typhoon season
Timeline of the 2009 Pacific typhoon season
Effects of the 2009 Pacific typhoon season in the Philippines
Typhoon Meari (2004)
Typhoon Ma-on (2004)
Typhoon Wipha (2013)
Typhoon Vongfong (2014)
Typhoon Choi-wan (2009)
October 2009 North American storm complex

References

External links

JMA General Information of Typhoon Melor (0918) from Digital Typhoon
JMA Best Track Data of Typhoon Melor (0918) 
JTWC Best Track Data of Super Typhoon 20W (Melor)
20W.MELOR from the U.S. Naval Research Laboratory

Melor
Melor
Melor
Melor
Melor
Melor
September 2009 events in Asia
October 2009 events in Asia
Melor